Doseon Guksa (a.k.a. Yogong Seonsa, Yeongi Doseon) was a Korean Buddhist monk (826-898) who lived during the decline of the Silla Dynasty, just prior to the foundation of the Goryeo Dynasty.  At least 70 temples, monasteries and hermitages are claimed to have been founded either under Doseon's supervision and direction, or by orders of Taejo of Goryeo following Doseon's recommendations.

Doseon Guksa remains one of the Silla Dynasty's most well-known and oft cited figures, remaining extremely influential throughout the remainder of Korean history up to the present.

Childhood

Doseon Guksa came from the Gurim Village in Gunseomyeon District of Yeongamgun, Jeollanamdo, on the western slopes of Wolchulsan.  Although Doseon's family name was Kim records indicate there was a rumor that Doseon was a descendant of a secondary son of Silla's Great King Taejong Muyeol (664-681).  Legend has it Doseon's mother had a conception-dream where she swallowed a beautiful pearl (a symbol of pure wisdom), and during her first month of pregnancy chanted Buddhist scriptures, all the time abstaining from meat, onions and garlic.

From infancy on, Doseon was considered a Buddhist prodigy, learning the chants of basic Sutras soon after he could talk.

Doseon spent part of his childhood, around 835, at Munsuam (Bodhisattva of Wisdom Hermitage)

In 841 Doseon left Yeongam to become a monk at the age of 15, and was accepted to study in  Hwaeomsa in Gurye County.  Within a month Doseon attained "the ineffable wisdom of Munsubosal and the mystic gate of Bohyeonbosal, penetrating the Great Meaning of the Hwaeomgyeong Sutra". Doseon was awarded a great honor by being given the name "Yeongi", which was the name of the master-monk who founded Hwaeomsa in 544.

Early adult life

In 846 at the age of 20 Doseon became recognized as a highly respected Daoist master. He began studying Seon under the great Master and Sect Founder Hyecheol Jeoginseonsa at
Dongnisan Taeansa Monastery.

Travels

By 850 Doseon had received the Gujokgye Certification at Cheondosa, practiced asceticism in a cave of Unbongsan and sometimes spending summers in a grotto on Taebaeksan.  He journeyed to Tang China to further study, focusing on esoteric Daoist and Buddhist astronomical, astrological, mathematical, geomantic (Feng Shui), cosmological and I Ching  (Juyeokgyeong) teachings.

Upon returning to Korea Doseon ventured throughout the Korean Peninsula, noting the geography, and searching for the source of its unique energies.  Ending his travels, Doseon built a small hut to rest and meditate in on "Bowl Hill", in western Jirisan where, legend says, a Sanshin appeared to Doseon and offered the "deepest secrets of Pungsujiri" as another "method by which great Bodhisattvas grant salvation to humankind".  The Korean Pungsu (풍수) system/wisdom comes from a sacred/ancient indigenous Korean source, not entirely from the study of Chinese Feng Shui.

Later adult life

Doseon founded, constructed and settled in at Okryongsa in Okryongmyeon District of Gwangyang City where he taught for 35 years.  King Heongang proclaimed Doseon Silla's leading Master monk because of his reputation for wisdom and insight.

Establishes Pungsu

Doseon studied the various Chinese Daoist schools of "Feng Shui" and adapted those ideas and  principles into the Korean landscape and cultural environment.  The "Bibo-pungsu-jiri" system that he established, focuses on "harmony with nature" placing greater emphasis on the spiritual and material energies of mountains and their ranges, and the resultant effects on communities and the nation as a whole, rather than on personal fortunes and interior furniture placement.

Doseon is remembered with such honor because of his genius in adapting the Chinese Feng-shui theories into Korea's, very different, land and climate conditions, while placing emphasis on larger values, thus creating Korea's own unique form, "Pungsu-jiri-seol".

Establishes fortune tellers

Doseon also is considered to have developed the concept of the "Baekdu-daegan", the earth-energy "spine" of the Korean Peninsula, by making many accurate predictions of future changes to the courses of events for individuals and the Kingdom.   Doseon is consequently regarded as a kind of founder-patron-spirit of modern Korean fortune tellers.

Influences

Doseon derives much of his renown as the most influential adviser to Wang Geon, who becomes Goryeo's King Taejo. In 875 when passing by an aristocratic mansion under construction at Songaksan, Doseon recognized the grand auspiciousness of the site and tells the young owner that in two years his wife would give birth to a son who would grow to be a great man, leading Korea into a new age.  Doseon gives the man a document (believed to be the Doseon-bigi) in a sealed envelope telling the young owner to keep it safe and a secret, to only give it to the boy when he grows up.  The young owner complied and the boy born there as prophesied, followed the advice within that document, becoming the founding King of the new Goryeo Dynasty.

Doseon left behind advice and concepts, especially in the Doseon-bigi, that were significant in choosing the placement of the capital and other important cities and fortresses within the country, and in constructing many new grand Buddhist temples at geomagnetically auspicious sites.

Final years

Records indicate that Doseon died in 898 while sitting in the lotus position in front of his many disciples at Baekunsan Okryongsa.  Following the death of Doseon, King Hyogong conferred the posthumous title of Yogong Seonsa (Essential Emptiness Meditation Master) upon him.  His students erected a pagoda called Jingseonghyedeungtap in his honor at Okryongsa, however the pagoda no longer exists.

Accolades

Goryeo's King Sukjong posthumously promoted Doseon to the rank of Wangsa (Royal Preceptor/Teacher of the King).  King Injong further promoted Doseon to the highest possible rank, Guksa (National Master), with the name/title Seongak Guksa and common usage title Doseon Guksa (Tao Abundance National Master).

King Uijong erected a monument to Doseon in Goryeo's capital city of Gaeseong, according to records.

References 

Silla Buddhist monks